A. H. Fischer Features was a film production company. B. A. Rolfe worked on some of its films. Charles A. Logue was the company's secretary.

The company used a former Thanhouser studio space in New Rochelle, New York. Rolfe also filmed the company's productions in the Adirondacks.

Fischer was from Montreal and the brother of Meyer Fischer.

Filmography
A Screamin the Night (1919)
The Red Virgin (1919)
The Amazing Lovers (1919), based on stories by Robert W. Chambers
Man and Woman (1920)
Even as Eve (1920), based on the 1901 novel The Shining Band by Robert W. ChambersMan and Woman (1920)Miss 139'' (1921)

References

Film production companies of the United States